Anhydrophryne is a genus of frogs in the family Pyxicephalidae, formerly in Petropedetidae. It is endemic to South Africa. Until recently, the genus was monotypic, containing only Anhydrophryne rattrayi, until it absorbed two more species formerly classified as belonging to genus Arthroleptella.

Species
The genus contains these species:
 Anhydrophryne hewitti (FitzSimons, 1947) – Hewitt's moss frog
 Anhydrophryne ngongoniensis (Bishop and Passmore, 1993) – Ngoni moss frog
 Anhydrophryne rattrayi Hewitt, 1919 – Hogsback frog

References

 
Endemic amphibians of South Africa
Pyxicephalidae
Amphibian genera
Taxa named by John Hewitt (herpetologist)